Kayamkulam Philipose Ramban, was a Syriac scholar belonging to the Malankara Orthodox Syrian Church who made the translation of the Bible for the first time to the vernacular language Malayalam.

He lived in Kayamkulam, in his family home, Mananganazhikathu, latterly it is known as Mananganazhikathu Rambachan's House. Rev Claudius Buchanan, a missionary who visited Kerala in the early 19th century, persuaded church leaders to translate the holy text into the regional language and gave guidance to local scholars. At that time Syriac was the liturgical language of Christians in Kerala. "Four Gospels translated by Ramban was the first version of the Bible which appeared in book format in Malayalam".

Ramban Philipose died in 1811, and his mortal remains were interred at Kannamcode Cathedral, (Kannamkode St. Thomas Orthodox Cathedral) belonging to Malankara Orthodox Syrian Church, which is one of the prominent worship centre in Adoor, Kerala, India.

The church celebrates memorial feast (shraadha perunnal) of Philipose Ramban every year on Malayalam month "Thulam 26th".

See also
 Kayamkulam
 Kannamcode St. Thomas Orthodox Cathedral
 Malankara Orthodox Syrian  Church

Notes

Malankara Orthodox Syrian Church Christians
1811 deaths
19th-century Oriental Orthodox Christians